Ambalabe may refer to one of the following locations in Madagascar:

 Ambalabe, Antalaha in Antalaha District, Sava Region
 Ambalabe, Vatomandry in Vatomandry District, Atsinanana Region

See also
 Ambalabe Befanjava in Mahajanga II District, Boeny Region